This is a list of rolling stock at Llangollen Railway, a preserved railway in Llangollen, North Wales.

Steam locomotives
The collection is predominantly made up of ex-Great Western or Midland locomotives, with a small number of industrial engines.

Operational

FW = Facing Corwen, FE = Facing Llangollen

Undergoing overhaul, restoration, construction or repairs

Locomotives Stored

DMUs

Diesel locomotives

Coaching stock 
Following the collapse of the Llangollen Railway PLC, a number of coaches were sold off at auction to cover costs. Further a number of privately owned vehicles were transferred to other lines leaving behind a much reduced fleet of passenger carrying vehicles. The jewel of the carriages now falls to the fleet of five restored ex-BR Suburbans, owned by the Llangollen Railway Trust and managed by the subsidiary "Llangollen Surburban Group".

Locomotives formerly based at Llangollen

Steam Locomotives

Diesel Locomotives

References

Llangollen Railway
Llangollen Railway